Enrique Dupont (born 23 August 1958) is a sailor from Uruguay, who represented his country at the 1984 Summer Olympics in Los Angeles, United States as crew member in the Soling. With helmsman Bernd Knuppel and fellow crew member Alejandro Ferreiro they took the 16th place.

References

Living people
1958 births
Sailors at the 1984 Summer Olympics – Soling
Olympic sailors of Uruguay
Uruguayan male sailors (sport)